Edward Ichabod "Ed" Decter (born May 19, 1959) is an American film director, producer and screenwriter.

Early life and education 
Born in West Orange, New Jersey, Decter graduated from Wesleyan University in 1979.

Career 
His credits include, There's Something About Mary, The Santa Clause 2, The Santa Clause 3, The New Guy, The Lizzie McGuire Movie, and television series Boy Meets World, In Plain Sight, and Shadowhunters.

He frequently collaborates with fellow producer and writer John J. Strauss. His production company was Frontier Pictures. In 1998, he, along with Strauss took on the role for Barry Kemp as the showrunner for the new CBS Tom Selleck comedy The Closer.

Filmography

Film

Television
The numbers in writing credits refer to the number of episodes.

References

External links

1959 births
Film producers from New Jersey
American male screenwriters
American television writers
Living people
People from West Orange, New Jersey
Wesleyan University alumni
American male television writers
Film directors from New Jersey
Screenwriters from New Jersey
Television producers from New Jersey